The  is a Japanese Shinkansen high-speed train type operated by East Japan Railway Company (JR East) on Komachi "mini-shinkansen" services on the Tōhoku Shinkansen and Akita Shinkansen from Tokyo to  since 16 March 2013. A pre-series set was delivered in June 2010 for extensive testing, with 23 full-production sets delivered between November 2012 and spring 2014.

Operations
The 7-car E6 series trains operate in conjunction with E5 series or H5 series (since March 2016) 10-car trains, initially on just four return services daily from 16 March 2013. They replaced all of the previous E3 series trains on Komachi services by 15 March 2014.

Design
Technology incorporated in these trains is derived from the experimental Fastech 360Z train previously tested by JR East. The E6 series trains are formed of seven cars, to provide the same seating capacity as six-car E3 series trains, due to the reduced seating capacity in the end cars. All cars feature active suspension with tilting up to 1.5 degrees.

Formation

Pre-production set S12
The pre-series train, numbered "S12" (later becoming "Z1"), was formed as follows, with car 11 at the Tokyo end and car 17 at the Morioka end.

 Car 11 provides Green (first class) accommodation.
 Cars 12 and 16 are each fitted with a single-arm pantograph. Like the E5 series, only one pantograph is normally used in service.
 Cars 11 to 14 were built by Kawasaki Heavy Industries, and cars 15 to 17 were built by Hitachi.

Full-production sets Z2–
The full-production trains, numbered "Z2" onward, are formed as follows, with car 11 at the Tokyo end and car 17 at the Morioka end.

 Car 11 provides Green (first class) accommodation.
 Cars 12 and 16 are each fitted with a single-arm pantograph.

Exterior
The overall styling was overseen by Japanese industrial designer Ken Okuyama, and is intended to evoke images of the Namahage demons and kantō festival lanterns for which Akita Prefecture is famous. The main body colour is  white with crimson roof and "arrow silver" bodyside stripe.

Interior
The new trains feature similar improvements to passenger accommodation as featured on the E5 series trains, including AC power outlets, and security cameras in vestibule areas. Seating in both Standard class and Green (first class) cars is in the standard 2+2 arrangement for mini-shinkansen trains. Cars 12, 13, 14, and 16 are equipped with toilets. The toilet in car 12 is universal access.

History

The pre-series set, S12, was delivered to Sendai Depot in June 2010, and formally accepted by JR East on 8 July. Test running commenced on the Tohoku Shinkansen in July 2010.

The first full-production set was delivered in November 2012, with production continuing until spring 2014.

The service name was also returned to simply Komachi.

In May 2014, the E6 series was awarded the 2014 Laurel Prize, presented annually by the Japan Railfan Club. The award presentation ceremony was held at Akita Station on 8 November 2014.

Fleet list

, 24 sets were in service, as shown below. 
Set Z9 was withdrawn in April 2022 following damage sustained from the 2022 Fukushima earthquake.

While the first sets from both Hitachi and Kawasaki Heavy Industries were delivered by sea to Sendai, set Z9 was delivered from the Kawasaki Heavy Industries factory in Kobe by rail to Akita Depot over three days from 31 May to 2 June 2013, mounted on temporary narrow-gauge (1,067 mm gauge) bogies and hauled by freight locomotives. This was followed by set Z11 from 21 to 23 June 2013.

Accidents and incidents 
E6 series set Z9, coupled with H5 series set H2 operating as Yamabiko 223 bound for Sendai derailed during the 2022 Fukushima earthquake while traveling between Fukushima and Shiroishi-Zaō stations. There were no injuries on board.

See also
 List of high speed trains

References

External links

 JR East E6 series 
 JR East E6 series (Japan Railfan Magazine Online) 

Shinkansen train series
East Japan Railway Company
Train-related introductions in 2013
Tilting trains
Hitachi multiple units
Kawasaki multiple units
Passenger trains running at least at 300 km/h in commercial operations
25 kV AC multiple units
20 kV AC multiple units